Zhylgaia is a genus of fossil bird. Its remains, consisting of two partial humeri, were recovered from an upper Paleocene deposit in Kazakhstan.

The relationships of this genus are unknown; it was initially placed in the Presbyornithidae, which at that time were believed to be some sort of "transitional shorebird". Upon recognition that the presbyornithids were more likely a prehistoric lineage of fairly advanced waterfowl, Zhylgaia was assigned to the form taxon "Graculavidae", an assemblage of Late Cretaceous and Paleocene shorebirds which are not a natural clade but merely an assemblage of superficially similar birds. All that can be said about this taxon is that it was a modern bird, most likely a neognath.

In 2008, Zhylgaia was assigned to Prophaethontidae—an extinct family related to modern tropicbirds—on the basis of its anatomy and size closely matching the prophaethontid Lithoptila.

References

 Nessov, L. A. (1988): [New Birds from the Cretaceous and Paleogene of Central Asia and Kazakhstan and Natural Conditions in Their Habitats]. Trudy Zoologicheskogo Instituta Akademii Nauk SSSR 182: 116–123. [Article in Russian]

Paleocene birds
Paleogene birds of Asia
Prophaethontidae
Fossils of Kazakhstan
Fossil taxa described in 1988